Dajing is a station on Line 14 of the Beijing Subway. This station opened on May 5, 2013.

Station Layout 
The station has an underground island platform.

Exits 
Dajing Station currently has 2 exits, lettered "A" and "B", both of which are on the north side of Fengti South Road. Exit A is accessible by elevator.

Gallery

References

Railway stations in China opened in 2013
Beijing Subway stations in Fengtai District